"Make It Rain" is a song by Northern Irish musician Foy Vance. It was made famous by Ed Sheeran in 2014 when it was used in the television series Sons of Anarchy. Two additional versions of this song charted in the United States after they were performed on The Voice. One by Matt McAndrew in 2014 and another by Koryn Hawthorne in 2015.

Ed Sheeran version

Ed Sheeran's recording of the song was used in the penultimate episode of season 7 of the television series Sons of Anarchy. Sheeran was an avid fan of the music for the series and mentioned it in a tweet. When the show's creator (Kurt Sutter) read the tweet, he proposed that Sheeran record a song for one of the episodes. As Sheeran was touring with Foy Vance at the time, and as one of Vance's songs (Make It Rain) started with the lyrics "When the sins of my father / Weigh down in my soul", Sheeran thought it was appropriate for the series and with Vance's approval, Sheeran recorded the song to be used in the episode "Red Rose" broadcast on 2 December 2014.

Charts

Certifications

Matt McAndrew version

Charts

Koryn Hawthorne version

Charts

References

2014 songs
Atlantic Records singles
Ed Sheeran songs
Foy Vance songs
Songs written by Foy Vance
Songs about weather